377th may refer to:

377th Air Base Wing, wing of the United States Air Force based at Kirtland Air Force Base, New Mexico
377th Bombardment Group, first constituted at Fort Dix Army Air Base New Jersey in 1942
377th Field Artillery Regiment, field artillery regiment of the United States Army
1st Battalion, 377th Field Artillery Regiment
2nd Battalion, 377th Field Artillery Regiment
377th Fighter Squadron, inactive United States Air Force unit
377th Theater Sustainment Command (TSC), unit of the US Army
377th Troop Carrier Squadron, inactive United States Air Force unit

See also
377 (number)
377, the year 377 (CCCLXXVII) of the Julian calendar
377 BC